Mancinelli is an Italian surname. Notable people with the surname include:

Antonio Mancinelli (1452–1505), Italian humanist, grammarian and rhetorician
Daniel Mancinelli (born 1988), Italian racing driver
Dusty Mancinelli, Canadian film director
Giuseppe Mancinelli (1813–1875), Italian painter
Graziano Mancinelli (1937–1992), Italian show jumping rider
Gustavo Mancinelli (1842–1906), Italian painter
Joseph Mancinelli (born 1957), Canadian trade unionist
Laura Mancinelli (1933-2016), Italian writer and medievalist
Luigi Mancinelli (1848–1921), Italian classical composer and conductor
Marco Mancinelli (born 1982), Italian footballer
Roberto Mancinelli (disambiguation)
Stefano Mancinelli (born 1983), Italian basketball player

Italian-language surnames